William Swenson may refer to:

William D. Swenson, United States Army Officer, recipient of the Medal of Honor
Will Swenson (actor), American actor